Chalhuanca is a town in southern Peru, capital of the Aymaraes province in the Apurímac region. It is famous as one of the best places in Peru for canoeing and other river-related adventure sports. Their rivers are also renowned for their fish. Chalhuanca has a resort area named Pincahuacho which is famous for its volcanic waters.

Chalhuanca is the birthplace of Dina Boluarte, Peru's first female president.

Geography

Climate

Notable people
Dina Boluarte (born 1962), the 64th and the first female President of Peru was born in Chalhuanca.

References

External links

Populated places in the Apurímac Region